Charles A. Binder (November 2, 1857 New York City – May 16, 1891 Elizabeth, New Jersey) was an American lawyer and politician from New York.

Life
He attended Public Schools No. 20 and 40, and Heidenfield's Private Academy. He graduated from Columbia Law School in 1877, was admitted to the bar in 1878, and practiced in New York City.

He was a member of the New York State Assembly (New York Co., 10th D.) in 1884 and 1886.

He committed suicide on May 16, 1891, at the Sheridan House, located on the corner of Broad Street and Rahway Avenue, in Elizabeth, New Jersey, by shooting two bullets in his head. Binder had misappropriated about $20,000 from an estate of which he was co-executor, and feared to be arrested.

Sources
 The New York Red Book compiled by Edgar L. Murlin (published by James B. Lyon, Albany NY, 1897; pg. 503 and 505)
 First Annual Record of Assemblymen and Senators from the City of New York in the State Legislature published by the City Reform Club (1886; pg. 30f)
 Biographical sketches of the members of the Legislature in The Evening Journal Almanac (1886)
 A DEFAULTER'S SUICIDE in NYT on May 18, 1891

1857 births
1891 deaths
Lawyers from New York City
Republican Party members of the New York State Assembly
Columbia Law School alumni
Suicides by firearm in New Jersey
American politicians who committed suicide
19th-century American politicians
Politicians from New York City
19th-century American lawyers
1890s suicides
Multiple gunshot suicides